The Detroit Bright's Goodyears were a minor league professional ice hockey team, and one of the four founding members of the International Hockey League in 1945, and operated until 1949. They played their home games at Olympia Stadium in Detroit, Michigan.

Standings

External links
 standings and statistics

International Hockey League (1945–2001) teams
B
Professional ice hockey teams in Michigan
Defunct ice hockey teams in the United States
Ice hockey clubs established in 1945
Ice hockey clubs disestablished in 1949
1945 establishments in Michigan
1949 disestablishments in Michigan